Williams Peak, at  high is the 6th highest peak in the Sawtooth Mountains of Idaho and is located within the Sawtooth Wilderness portion of the Sawtooth National Recreation Area.

Views of the peak may be accessed from the scenic Idaho State Highway 75, and on hiking trails from Redfish Lake and throughout the Sawtooth and White Cloud Mountains.

History
Williams Peak is named for pioneer Dave Williams, who was a part of the first ascent team in 1934 along with Robert and Miriam Underhill.  Williams also owned the property of what is now the Idaho Rocky Mountain Ranch, which looks toward the peak.

Routes

1)  The June/ North Couloir (III 5.7) – This prominent steep couloir cuts up the northeast face to a notch just below the summit.  It's fairly easy access from the Alpine Way Trail near Marshall Lake.  The couloir often has ice, rock, and snow and is blocked by a large cornice in the winter near the top. The first ascent came in 1986 by Kirk Bachman and B. Franklin.

Rope up at the base of the couloir and expect highly variable conditions on snow and ice. The route is straightforward. At the top of the couloir, follow the ridge to the west and then the south to the summit. It's only  from the top of the couloir to the summit proper. The easiest descent is to utilize the south facing routes to get back to the trail.

2)  Southeast Slopes (Class 3) – Easy access from the Alpine Way Trail make this method probably the easiest and quickest route on the mountain. Winter time offers great snow climbing and ski descents here.

3)  East Ridge (Class 4) – A more challenging route involves up and down scrambling on the prominent southeast ridge above the Southeast Slopes route. There are sections of extreme exposure and steep, loose gullies to cross over. Mountain Goats were encountered on this route.

4)  Southwest Couloir (Class 3) – This route is readily accessible from the Thompson / Williams Saddle (Thompson and Williams can be done together) or the Lake 8865 area.

Images

See also

 List of peaks of the Sawtooth Range (Idaho)
 List of mountains of Idaho
 List of mountain peaks of Idaho
 List of mountain ranges in Idaho

References

External links
 Rural Network
 nrcs.USDA.gov
 FS.Fed.US

Mountains of Custer County, Idaho
Mountains of Idaho
Sawtooth National Forest